Stewart James Drummond (born 11 December 1975) is an English former footballer who last played for Morecambe.

A central midfielder, Drummond represented three clubs during a career spanning twenty-one years. He most notably spent a total of seventeen years at Morecambe, where he began playing in 1994 and retired in May 2015.

Career
Signed by Chester City after a long spell with Morecambe in 2004, he went on to spend two years with the Blues and was named as the club's player of the year in 2005–06. He then opted to join Shrewsbury Town on the Bosman ruling on 12 May 2006. Drummond scored on his début for Town on the opening game of 2006–07, at home to Mansfield Town.

He scored his fifth goal of the season for Shrewsbury at Wembley in the 2007 Football League Two Play-off Final, in a 3–1 loss against Bristol Rovers.

Midway during the 2007/08 season, speculation linked Drummond with a move back to Morecambe, and in January 2008, it was announced that Morecambe had re-signed Drummond from Shrewsbury Town for a fee of £15,000
.

Personal life

Drummond has three sons, named respectively Vinny, Teddy and Caspar.

Honours

Morecambe
Capped by England Semi-Professional team.
Conference League Cup winners: 1997-98 in English football
Football Conference play-off semi-finalists: 2002-03 in English football
Lancashire FA Challenge Trophy winners: 1995-96 in English football; 1998-99 in English football; 2003-04 in English football
Football League Two play-off semi-finalists: 2009–10

Chester City
Player of the Season: 2005–06

Shrewsbury Town
Football League Two play-off finalists: 2006–07.

Individual
Football Conference Team of the Year: 2002–03

References

External links

Living people
1975 births
English footballers
Association football midfielders
Morecambe F.C. players
Chester City F.C. players
Shrewsbury Town F.C. players
England semi-pro international footballers
Footballers from Preston, Lancashire
English Football League players
National League (English football) players
Morecambe F.C. non-playing staff